The European Championship or European Open (officially called the European IBJJF Jiu-Jitsu Championship) is the most prestigious and largest Brazilian Jiu-Jitsu tournament held in Europe by the International Brazilian Jiu-Jitsu Federation (IBJJF). The tournament is an open championship accepting competitors from all countries.

The IBJJF gives tournaments weighting which helps calculate the number of points an athlete can win via their participation.  For the 2017/2018 IBJJF calendar the European Championship has a weighting of 4 alongside the Pan-American Championship (jiu-jitsu) making it second in importance only to the World Jiu-Jitsu Championship which has a weighting of 7.

From 2004 the championship was held  near Lisbon, Portugal, in 2022 it was moved to Rome, Italy after skipping 2021 due to the COVID-19 pandemic, in 2023 it took place in Paris, France.

Black belt male champions by year and weight

Black belt female champions by year and weight

See also 
 IBJJF
 Brazilian Jiu-Jitsu weight classes
 World IBJJF Jiu-Jitsu Championship
 World IBJJF Jiu-Jitsu No-Gi Championship
 European IBJJF Jiu-Jitsu No-Gi Championship
 Pan IBJJF Jiu-Jitsu Championship
 Pan IBJJF Jiu-Jitsu No-Gi Championship
 Brazilian National Jiu-Jitsu Championship
 Brazilian Nationals Jiu-Jitsu No-Gi Championship
 Asian IBJJF Jiu Jitsu Championship

References 

European Championship